In film, reframing is a change in camera angle without a cut and can include changing the focus of the scene. The term has been more often used in film criticism than in actual cinema.  Critics of the technique include André Bazin among others.

In production or post-production, reframing can be used to change a sequence without having to reshoot. For example, zooming in on an actor to edit out nudity for a movie to be broadcast over the air.

Types of reframing can include: pan, tilt, zoom, crane or boom shot, dolly or trucking shot, handheld shot, tracking shot, and steadycam shot.

Notable films in which reframing is used

A Bug's Life
Citizen Kane
The Player
Pretty Baby

References

Film and video terminology
Film and video technology